Roland Alain Daigle (born August 24, 1954) is a Canadian former professional ice hockey forward who played six seasons with the Chicago Black Hawks of the National Hockey League from 1974–75 to 1979–80.

As a youth, Daigle played in the 1966 and 1967 Quebec International Pee-Wee Hockey Tournaments with a minor ice hockey team from Cap-de-la-Madeleine. Daigle was drafted 34th overall by the Blackhawks in the 1974 NHL amateur draft. He played 389 career NHL games, scoring 56 goals and 50 assists for 106 points.

Career statistics

Regular season and playoffs

References

External links
 

1954 births
Living people
Canadian expatriate ice hockey players in Austria
Canadian expatriate ice hockey players in France
Canadian ice hockey forwards
Chicago Blackhawks draft picks
Chicago Blackhawks players
French Quebecers
HC TWK Innsbruck players
Ice hockey people from Quebec
New Brunswick Hawks players
Quebec Nordiques (WHA) draft picks
Rapaces de Gap players
Sherbrooke Jets players
Sportspeople from Trois-Rivières
Trois-Rivières Draveurs players
Trois-Rivières Ducs players